Pyaar Tune Kya Kiya (International Title: Love... What Have You Done?) is an Indian television drama series, which premiered on 23 May 2014 on Zing. The second season of the show was launched in September 2014, the third season was launched on 21 November 2014, the fourth season was launched on 17 April 2015, the fifth season was launched on 17 July 2015, the sixth season was launched on 2 October 2015, the seventh season was launched on 12 February 2016, the eighth season was launched on 1 July 2016 and the ninth season was launched on 18 November 2016 and ended on 27 October 2017. Season 11 was launched on 24 October 2020 and season 12 on 15 August 2021.

Season 1–4 were hosted by Surbhi Jyoti, Parth Samthaan and Meiyang Chang. Season 5 was hosted by Smriti Kalra, Season 6 by Karan Kundra, Season 7 by Siddharth Gupta and Niti Taylor, Season 8 was hosted by Arjit Taneja, Abhishek Mallik and Shaleen Malhotra and Season 9 was hosted by Prince Narula. The title song of the series is sung by Jubin Nautiyal.

Pyaar Tune Kya Kiya released its spin off titled Pyaar Pehli Baar in 2018 and Kareena Kapoor Khan promoted the show.

Plot
Pyaar Tune Kya Kiya is a TV series, which presents different love stories inspired from lives of Indian youth. The show narrates tragic love stories of youngsters and showcase how today's couples face various challenging situations, complications, complexities and confusion in order to understand the sentiment of love and the decisions they make in life. Each episode highlights the mistake that youngsters make in their love life. It also has a social message in each episode.

Episodes

Season 01

Season 02

Season 03

Season 04

Season 05

Season 06

Season 07

Season 08

Season 09

Season 10

Season 11

Season 12

Season 13

Cast

Narrators
 Meiyang Chang (Season 01, Season 02)
 Surbhi Jyoti (Season 02, Season 03)
 Parth Samthaan (Season 04)
 Smriti Kalra (Season 05)
 Anita Hassanandani 
 Karan Kundrra (Season 06)
 Niti Taylor as Vidhi (Season 07)
 Siddharth Gupta as Akash/Sid (Season 07)
 Abhishek Malik (Season 08)
 Arjit Taneja (Season 08)
 Shaleen Malhotra (Season 08)
 Prince Narula (Season 09)

Episode cast
 S01 E01 Ayaz Ahmed as Siddharth Rawat, Chetna Pande as Piyali and Parth Samthaan as Gaurav
 S01 E02 Abigail Jain as Niti, Anshuman Malhotra as Ansh and Mrinal Dutt as Harsh
 S01 E03 Charlie Chauhan as Maya, Shakti Arora as Avinash, Kajal Pisal as Priya and Baby Farida as Maya's Grandmother
 S01 E06 Rohit Khandelwal as Chris
 S01 E07 Meghan Jadhav as Shankar, Richa Mukherjee as Shivani and Suyyash Kumar as Dhananjay
 S01 E09 Sehban Azim as Karan and Puja Sharma as Simran
 S01 E10 Shrishti Ganguly Rindani as Deepti and Lavin Gothi as Rohit
 S01 E11 Priyal Gor as Zohra and Paras Arora as Sumer
 S01 E12 Nikita Sharma as Koyal
 S01 E13 Shravan Reddy as Rohan, Megha Gupta as Riddhima Sahni and Aashish Kaul as Rohan's Father 
 S01 E14 Namish Taneja as Sid and (Siddhi Karwa) as Alia
 S02 E01 Neha Sargam as Priya and (Ankit Raizada) as Rahul
 S02 E02 Adhish Khanna as Abhay and Fenil Umrigar as Rhea
 S02 E03 Ahsaas Channa as Manisha and Harsh Mehta as Suraj
 S02 E05 Karishma Sharma as Suheena, Yuvraj Thakur as Amar and Vikas Grover as Ranvijay
 S02 E12 Aditya Singh Rajput as Vasu and Neha Saxena as Amruta
 S03 E04 Harsh Rajput as Prashant
 S03 E06 Ashita Zaveri as Komal and Zaan Khan as Rohan
 S03 E12 Shilpa Saklani as Aparna
 S04 E02 Sheena Lakhani
 S04 E03 Harsh Rajput as Raghav
 S04 E04 Krissann Barretto as Raima
 S04 E13 Kanchi Singh as Veebha and Rohit Suchanti as Dhruv
 S05 E06 Samridh Bawa as Manjot
 S05 E08 Rohit Suchanti as Vikram
 S06 E05 Mahima Makwana as Mandira
 S06 E06 Ashish Dixit as Sanjay Mishra
 S06 E07 Akash Gill as Mahir and Aashish Kaul as Mahir's Father
 S06 E08 Amit Tandon as Professor Akash
 S06 E09 Kanwar Dhillon as Lucky
 S06 E14 Mohsin Khan as Suraj 
 S06 E19 Rohit Khandelwal as Sreedhar
 S07 E02 Paras Chhabra as Aryaman
 S07 E04 Aneri Vajani as Arushi
 S07 E09 Chitrashi Rawat as Rhea and Avinash Mukherjee  as Ayush
 S07 E11 Shivangi Joshi as Jyothi and Shagun Pandey as Raju 
 S07 E14 Mohsin Khan  as Girish
 S07 E16 Rohit Suchanti as Abhay
 S08 E04 Priyank Sharma as Shaan
 S08 E06 Mansi Srivastava as Suhana
 S08 E17 Utkarsh Gupta as Jaideep 
 S08 Roop Durgapal as Sharmishtha 
 S08 Poorti Arya
 S09 E17 Alice Kaushik as Meera
 S09 E01 Niyati Fatnani as Shazia
 S09 E02 Parveen Kaur as Harpreet
 S09 E04 Aparna Mishra as Sahiba and Shagun Pandey as Mirzya
 S09 E05 Nikhil Khurana
 S09 E09 Rohit Suchanti as Rajveer
 S09 E10 Priyank Sharma as Surjit
 S09 E27 Vishal Bhardwaj (actor) and Radhika Bangia as Ruhi
 S09 E41 Avinash Mishra as Kabir and Jiya Shankar as Nancy
 S10 E06 Sandesh Gour as Vishwa and Ketki Kadam as Vaidehi
 S11 E02 Eisha Singh as Preet
 S11 E10 Raquib Arshad as Satvik
 S11 E14 Shagun Pandey as Sudhish
 S13 E01 Sohil Singh Jhuti as Neil
 Ritwika Gupta as Amisha 
 Megha Gupta as Professor 
 Pooja Sharma as Simran
 Randeep Rai as Mohit
 Manali (in an episodic role)
 Nikki Sharma as Niharika (in an episodic role)
 Kunal Jaisingh
 Trishal Kumar 
 Avinash Mukherjee
 Puru Chibber
 Shakti Arora
 Neha Saxena
 Anshuman Malhotra
 Bharati Kumar
 Ankit Modgil
 Ahsaas Channa
 Ruby Kakar
 Harshad Arora
 Kanan Malhotra
 Kiran Srinivas
 Kinshuk Vaidya
 Sheena Bajaj
 Buneet Kapoor as Krishav
 Sanaya Pithawalia

References

External links
 
 

Indian anthology television series
Indian drama television series
2014 Indian television series debuts
Indian teen drama television series
2017 Indian television series endings
Indian romance television series